Baloana is a village in Pakistan. 

Villages in Chiniot District